The 2012 Uruguay Open was a professional tennis tournament played on clay courts. It was the eighth edition of the tournament which was part of the 2012 ATP Challenger Tour. It took place in Montevideo, Uruguay between October 29 and November 4, 2012.

Singles main draw entrants

Seeds

 1 Rankings are as of October 22, 2012.

Other entrants
The following players received wildcards into the singles main draw:
  Ariel Behar
  Marko Djokovic
  Marcel Felder
  Máximo González

The following players received entry as an alternate into the singles main draw:
  Boy Westerhof

The following players received entry as a special exempt into the singles main draw:
  Diego Schwartzman

The following players received entry from the qualifying draw:
  Tomislav Brkić
  Arthur De Greef
  Diego Junqueira
  Stéphane Robert
  Antal van der Duim (Lucky loser)

Champions

Singles

 Horacio Zeballos def.  Julian Reister, 6–3, 6–2

Doubles

 Nikola Mektić /  Antonio Veić def.  Blaž Kavčič /  Franco Škugor, 6–3, 5–7, [10–7]

External links
Official Website

Uruguay Open
Uruguay Open
2012 in Uruguayan tennis